Parastenomordella is a genus of South American beetles in the family Mordellidae, containing the following species:

 Parastenomordella ensifera Franciscolo, 1989
 Parastenomordella flavolongevittata Ermisch, 1950

References

Mordellidae